Kim Jung-nam (born 28 January 1943) is a South Korean former football player and manager.

International career
Kim Jung-nam and his partner Kim Ho are regarded as some of the greatest South Korean centre-back duos of all time. In 1962, Kim Jung-nam played for the South Korean national youth team, and was also selected for the South Korea's senior team. He was on the national team until 1973, and had 67 caps including matches in the 1970 Asian Games where he won a gold medal.

Managerial career
After his retirement, Kim Jung-nam managed the national team in the 1986 FIFA World Cup qualification, and South Korea qualified for the FIFA World Cup for the first time in 32 years after the 1954 FIFA World Cup. In the group stage of the 1986 FIFA World Cup, Kim and South Korea lost to Argentina and Italy, and drew with Bulgaria. After the World Cup, he won the 1986 Asian Games.

Kim is the manager to win the most games in the K League with 210 victories. He also has two K League titles.

Personal life 
He is the elder brother of twins Kang-nam and Sung-nam, who also became national players.

Career statistics

International

Honours

Player
Korea University
Korean National Championship: 1963

Yangzee
Korean National Championship: 1968
Korean President's Cup: 1968
Asian Champion Club Tournament runner-up: 1969

South Korea U20
 AFC Youth Championship runner-up: 1962

South Korea
 Asian Games: 1970

Individual
KASA Best Korean Footballer: 1969, 1970
Korean FA Best XI: 1969, 1970, 1971
Korean FA Player of the Year: 1971

Manager
Yukong Elephants
 K League 1: 1989

Ulsan Hyundai
 K League 1: 2005
 Korean League Cup: 2007
 Korean Super Cup: 2006
 A3 Champions Cup: 2006

South Korea
 Asian Games: 1986
 AFC Asian Cup runner-up: 1980

Individual
K League 1 Manager of the Year: 1989
K League Hall of Fame: 2023

References

External links
 
 Kim Jung-nam – National Team Stats at KFA 
 

1943 births
Living people
South Korean footballers
South Korea international footballers
Olympic footballers of South Korea
Footballers at the 1964 Summer Olympics
South Korean football managers
Jeju United FC managers
Ulsan Hyundai FC managers
South Korea national football team managers
1980 AFC Asian Cup managers
1986 FIFA World Cup managers
Footballers from Seoul
Qingdao Hainiu F.C. (1990) managers
Shandong Taishan F.C. managers
South Korean expatriate sportspeople in China
Expatriate football managers in China
Korea University alumni
Asian Games medalists in football
Footballers at the 1970 Asian Games
Asian Games gold medalists for South Korea
Medalists at the 1970 Asian Games
South Korean expatriate football managers
Association football sweepers